The North Fork Ospreys are a summer collegiate baseball team; one of the seven teams organized by Hamptons Collegiate Baseball (HCB), an NCAA-sanctioned collegiate summer baseball league. The team plays its home games in Cochran Park, Peconic, New York.

History 
The North Fork Ospreys were introduced as a four-team expansion to the Hampton Division in 2009. In 2009, the Ospreys finished first in the Hampton Division under the management of Shawn Epidendio with a record of 25-15. They defeated the Riverhead Tomcats in the semi-final but lost to the Westhampton Aviators in the Hamptons Division Championship Series, 1-2. 

Epidendio led the Ospreys to another first-place finish in 2010, going 27-13, a division record. They ousted the Southampton Breakers in the semi-final and defeated the Riverhead Tomcats in the Championship Series to claim their first Hamptons Division Championship Title. They went on to face the Wolff Division's Quakertown Blazers in the Atlantic Collegiate Baseball League (ACBL) Championship Series. They swept the Blazers in the best-of-three series to capture North Fork's first ACBL Title. 

In 2011, Brian Hansen, formerly the assistant coach, took over the management of the Ospreys. He was assisted by former Dutch pro-league pitcher, Michiel van Kampen. Hurt by an eight-game losing streak in the middle of the season, the Ospreys finished tied for third in the Hamptons Division with a 20-20 record. They defeated the Southampton Breakers in the semi-finals but again lost to the Westhampton Aviators in the Championship Series.

Records 
 2019
 Wins  Losses

Home  0  2

Away  0  2

Total 0  4

2011

2010

2009

Alumni 

Andrew Cain (UNC-Wilmington); an outfielder for the 2009 Ospreys; drafted in the 12th round (371st overall) of the 2011 MLB Amateur Player Draft by the Milwaukee Brewers.

References

External links 
 Hamptons Collegiate Baseball
 Atlantic Collegiate Baseball League

Atlantic Collegiate Baseball League teams
2009 establishments in New York (state)
Baseball teams established in 2009
Sports in Long Island
Amateur baseball teams in New York (state)